Thomas Vijayan is an Indian wildlife photographer and businessman from Bangalore who is based in Dubai.

Biography
He has traveled around the world, covering all the seven continents for his passion for photography. He has won the Wildlife Photographer of the Year – People's Choice Award by Natural History Museum, London.

Vijayan is an architect born and raised in Bangalore, India. Hailing from a photography family he started photography at the age of 10. Later he settled in Canada with his family.

In 2015, he was appointed as the first brand ambassador of Nikon for the Middle East & Africa.

In 2016, Vijayan was the recipient of the Wildlife Photographer of the Year – People's Choice Award by UK-based Natural History Museum, London for his picture titled ‘Swinging time’. The picture was selected from 42,000 entries submitted from 96 different countries and has been added to the Museum's special collection.

In 2019, Vijayan beat thousands of entries from all across the world to achieve top prize in the Society of International Nature and Wildlife Photographers Bird Photographer of the Year.

He is the winner of International Photography Award in 2021.

Awards
PHOTO IS LIGHT – World Photography Contest 2021
World Nature Photographer of the Year Award 2020
Siena International Photo Awards 2020
Moscow International Foto Awards (MIFA) 2020
Tokyo International Foto Awards (TIFA) 2020 in Gold Category
Windland Smith Rice Award 2019 for Nature's Best Photography
1st place in SINWP Bird Photographer of the Year 2019
Wildlife Photographer of the Year 2017

References

Nature photographers
Living people
21st-century photographers
Year of birth missing (living people)